YYY may refer to:

Yeah Yeah Yeahs, a band from New York
Mont-Joli Airport, serving Mont-Joli, Quebec, Canada (IATA code YYY)
The Yada Yada, an expression popularized on the TV series Seinfeld
YYY, the production code for the 1974 Doctor Who serial The Monster of Peladon
YYY, a 2020 Thai television series with LGBT characters